Fortis Academy is a co-educational secondary school and sixth form located in the Great Barr area of Birmingham, England.

History
The school was officially opened by D. Rogers on 24 September 1957 as Great Barr Comprehensive School. The school had opened in September 1955 with thirteen forms of 11-year-old boys and girls and 615 pupils between the ages of 12 and 15, who were transferred from the Aldridge Road Boys and Girls Modern Schools which ceased to exist at that time. Oswald Beynon was the first headmaster.

The modern schools building had been incorporated into the comprehensive school and became the Lower School, with new buildings comprising the Middle and Upper Schools. The Lower school comprises the English and maths departments, with some science and technology rooms. The middle school is mainly made up of Technology rooms and the school's main library. The Upper School is primarily science, art, religious education, physical education and modern foreign languages.

In 2005, the school was designated as a specialist Science and Mathematics College. The school also gained a new specialist science building.

On 24 November 2005 the school's new music block was opened by then-headteacher, Brian Sherratt OBE. The date also marked the formal retirement of Sherratt after 21 years at the school.

Previously a foundation school administered by Birmingham City Council, in December 2016 Great Barr School converted to academy status and is now sponsored by the Shaw Education Trust. The school was later renamed Fortis Academy.

Artwork 

The school's frontage features two carved reliefs, the left one showing three boys playing football; the right one three girls playing netball. Originally bare stone, these were painted circa 2013.

Sixth Form Centre
Adjacent to the main school is the Sixth Form Centre. The sixth form centre acts as a college and form of higher education after leaving the last year, year 11. It provides its students with a two-year course, first contains AS level study and the second year contains A2 level. Most students choose to enter the Sixth form after their last year, as it provides many different courses including Media Studies, Business Studies, Further I.T, Higher Musical Courses, Higher Science, Law, Psychology and many others. The main focus of the Sixth Form Centre is the library called the O.L.C (Open Learning Centre), the centre also contains many class rooms and space for students to study. The centre also contains a specialist Law Room that is made to look like a 'mock-up' court.

Recently, the sixth form centre has begun to offer post-16 vocational courses to pupils who wish to follow a vocational route to further education or training. As of 2011, these courses have included a Level 3 BTEC's in Forensic Science and Applied Biology and courses in iMedia and Sports Science.

Notable former pupils

Great Barr Comprehensive 
 Steve Adey, musician and singer-songwriter
 Ryan Cartwright, actor 
 Daniel Ezra, actor
 Steven Linnecor, actor
 Martin Shaw, actor
 Muff Winwood, musician and record producer
 Steve Winwood, vocalist and keyboardist

Aldridge Road Modern Schools 
 Jeff Rooker, Baron Rooker, politician
 Dave Swarbrick, folk musician and singer-songwriter

References 
 E L Russell, Great Barr Comprehensive School Official Opening, City of Birmingham Education Committee, Birmingham 1957

External links 

 

Academies in Birmingham, West Midlands
Secondary schools in Birmingham, West Midlands
Great Barr
Shaw Education Trust
1957 establishments in England